Sloothby is a small village in the East Lindsey district of Lincolnshire, England. In 1870-72 the township had a population of 242.

The village is mentioned five times in the Domesday Book.

The village has several farms, a Wesleyan chapel dating from the 1890s, and a small mid-Victorian church – formerly known as "Sloothby Mission" – which is now closed. There is also a small antiques store in the village.

Governance
An electoral ward in the same name as the civil parish exists. This ward stretches south to Bilsby with a total population taken at the 2011 census of 2,027.

References

External links

 Sloothby Church, The Willoughby Group of Parishes

Villages in Lincolnshire
East Lindsey District